Lake Marion or Marion Lake may refer to:

Canada
 Marion Lake (Alberta), a street in Botha, Alberta

United States
 Marion Lake (Arkansas), a lake in Crittenden County
 Marion County Lake, a lake in Marion County, Kansas
 Marion Reservoir, a reservoir in Marion County, Kansas
 Marion Lake (Dakota County, Minnesota)
 Lake Marion (McLeod County, Minnesota)
 Marion Lake (Montana), a lake in Flathead County 
 Marion Lake (Oregon), a lake in Linn County
 Lake Marion (South Carolina), a reservoir formed by an impoundment on the Santee River
 Marion Lake (Teton County, Wyoming), a lake